USS Hyman G. Rickover (SSN-795), will be a  nuclear-powered attack submarine of the United States Navy and the second such boat commemorating Admiral Hyman G. Rickover, pioneer of the nuclear navy. The boat's sponsor is Darleen Greenert, wife of then Chief of Naval Operations, Admiral Jonathan Greenert. Both the boat's name and her sponsor were announced by the Secretary of the Navy at a ceremony at the Washington Navy Yard on 9 January 2015. Hyman G. Rickovers christening occurred on 31 July 2021.

Ship's name

References

External links
 The USS Hyman G. Rickover (SSN 795) Commissioning Committee

 

Virginia-class submarines
Nuclear submarines of the United States Navy